Hylands hörna ("Hyland's corner") was a Swedish talk show presented by Lennart Hyland. Broadcast between 1962 and 1983, it was the first talk show in Sweden.

The show started as a radio program on 10 October 1961. It moved to television in 1962 and is, in percentage, one of the most watched programs in Sweden ever.

Gallery

References

External links
 
 Hylands hörna at SVT Play
Hylands hörna at SVT's open archive 

Sveriges Television original programming
Swedish television talk shows
1962 Swedish television series debuts
1983 Swedish television series endings
1960s Swedish television series
1970s Swedish television series
1980s Swedish television series